A Google A Day is an online game from Google which invites the player to solve a lateral thinking puzzle by using Google to find the solution. A new puzzle was added every day. The questions may be any of the following categories: Sport, Science, Pop Culture, History, Arts and Literature, or Geography.  Some believe the game helps Google understand how users search for specific information. It was part of a larger campaign by Google to promote search education. It is accessible through the Google homepage by the "I'm Feeling Lucky" button, searching for it, or by going to "www.agoogleaday.com". Despite being discontinued in 2013, its homepage and link are still active.

References

External links 
 Official website
 Trailer of the Google+ edition on YouTube
 Google+ version of the game
 Google Gamification with "A-Google-A-Day" Trivia Game

Google services
Puzzle video games